Emblems and Names (Prevention of improper use) Act 1950 is a legislation in force in India.

Provisions
Emblems and Names (Prevention of improper use) Act 1950 prohibits the use of National Symbols for commercial use in India.

See also
 List of Acts of the Parliament of India

References

Acts of the Parliament of India 1950